Plainfield is a city in Bremer County, Iowa, United States. The population was 393 at the 2020 census, a decrease of 45, or 10.3%, from 438 in 2000. It is part of the Waterloo–Cedar Falls Metropolitan Statistical Area.

Geography
Plainfield is located at  (42.844652, -92.534623).

Demographics

2010 census
As of the census of 2010, there were 436 people, 185 households, and 123 families residing in the city. The racial makeup of the city was 97.9% White, 0.5% African American, 0.2% Pacific Islander, 0.2% from other races, and 1.1% from two or more races. Hispanic or Latino of any race were 0.5% of the population.

There were 185 households, of which 30.3% had children under the age of 18 living with them, 55.7% were married couples living together, 8.1% had a female householder with no husband present, 2.7% had a male householder with no wife present, and 33.5% were non-families. 28.1% of all households were made up of individuals, and 11.8% had someone living alone who was 65 years of age or older. The average household size was 2.36 and the average family size was 2.90.

The median age in the city was 37.8 years. 27.1% of residents were under the age of 18; 7.4% were between the ages of 18 and 24; 24.3% were from 25 to 44; 25.9% were from 45 to 64; and 15.4% were 65 years of age or older. The gender makeup of the city was 50.2% male and 49.8% female.

2000 census
As of the census of 2000, there were 438 people, 194 households, and 123 families residing in the city. The racial makeup of the city was 99.54% White, 0.23% Native American, and 0.23% from two or more races. Hispanic or Latino of any race were 0.91% of the population.

There were 194 households, out of which 29.4% had children under the age of 18 living with them, 56.2% were married couples living together, 7.2% had a female householder with no husband present, and 36.1% were non-families. 30.9% of all households were made up of individuals, and 16.5% had someone living alone who was 65 years of age or older. The average household size was 2.26 and the average family size was 2.85.

Age spread:  24.9% under the age of 18, 9.4% from 18 to 24, 25.6% from 25 to 44, 23.1% from 45 to 64, and 17.1% who were 65 years of age or older. The median age was 37 years. For every 100 females, there were 100.9 males. For every 100 females age 18 and over, there were 91.3 males.

The median income for a household in the city was $39,688, and the median income for a family was $48,750. Males had a median income of $30,536 versus $24,464 for females. The per capita income for the city was $18,156. About 4.6% of families and 8.0% of the population were below the poverty line, including 10.2% of those under age 18 and 5.7% of those age 65 or over.

Education
Nashua-Plainfield Community School District operates area public schools. It was established on July 1, 1997 by the merger of the Nashua and Plainfield school districts. Plainfield houses the intermediate school, while the elementary school and Nashua-Plainfield Middle School/High School are in Nashua.

Notable people
 Guy Stanton Ford, former president of the University of Minnesota
 Derek Pagel, football player
 Scott Walker (politician), former Governor of Wisconsin

References

External links
 

Plainfield, Iowa Portal style website, Government, Library, Local links, and more
 Horton Plainfield Historical Club

Cities in Bremer County, Iowa
Cities in Iowa
Waterloo – Cedar Falls metropolitan area